Trident Arts is an Indian film production and distribution company based in Chennai, Tamil Nadu. It was established in 1987 by R. Ravindran. Since then, it has produced and distributed several Tamil films.

History
Trident Arts was set up by R. Ravindran in 1987. Since then it has distributed several Tamil films in region wise in Tamil Nadu, then moved to a major distributor with the movies including Vikram Vedha, Tamizh Padam 2, Ratsasan, Seethakaathi, Dhilluku Dhuddu 2 and Kadaram Kondan. The company has produced films including Shivalinga, Lakshmi and Action. Its latest release was Kasada Thapara, released on 27 August 2021 in SonyLIV. The company's next productions are Enna Solla Pogirai, directed by A. Hariharan, starring Ashwin Kumar and Avantika Mishra, Hostel, directed by Sumanth Radhakrishnan, starring Ashok Selvan and Priya Bhavani Shankar, and Shot Boot 3, directed by Arun Vaidyanathan, starring Venkat Prabhu and Sneha.

Filmography

Productions and Major Distributions

Major region wise distributions

 Aan Paavam (1985)
 Amman Kovil Kizhakale (1986)
 Enga Ooru Pattukaran (1987)
 Arul Tharum Ayyappan (1987)
 Namma Ooru Nayagan (1988)
 Karakattakkaran (1989)
 Pongi Varum Kaveri (1989)
 Pudhu Vasantham (1990)
 Pandithurai (1992)
 Chinna Thayee (1992)
 Periya Gounder Ponnu (1992)
 Meera (1992)
 Sinna Mapplai (1993)
 Ezhai Jaathi (1993)
 Ulle Veliye (1993)
 Chinna Muthu (1994)
 Aranmanai Kaavalan (1994)
 Honest Raj (1994)
 Duet (1994)
 Ilaignar Ani (1994)
 Chutti Kuzhandhai (1995)
 Villadhi Villain (1995)
 Chakravarthy (1995)
 Vishnu (1995)
 Ayudha Poojai (1995)
 Maaman Magal (1995)
 Ullathai Allitha (1996)
 Mettukudi (1996)
 Parambarai (1996)
 Tata Birla (1996)
 Gopala Gopala (1996)
 Mettukudi (1996)
 Poomani (1996)
 Dharma Chakkaram (1997)
 Iruvar (1997)
 Mannava (1997)
 Thaali Pudhusu (1997)
 Vallal (1997)
 Ganga Gowri (1997)
 Porkaalam (1997)
 Vasuke (1997)
 Janakiraman (1997)
 Rettai Jadai Vayasu (1997)
 Porkaalam (1997)
 Kadhalukku Mariyadhai (1997)
 Poonthottam (1998)
 Moovendhar (1998)
 Kondattam (1998)
 Paattali (1999)
 Kannupada Poguthaiya (1999)
 Kallazhagar (1999)
 Nee Varuvai Ena (1999)
 Sethu (1999)
 Velai (1998)
 Vaettiya Madichu Kattu (1998)
 Rathna (1998)
 Aval Varuvala (1998)
 Poonthottam (1998)
 Thaayin Manikodi (1998)
 Desiya Geetham (1998)
 Guru Paarvai (1998)
 Anantha Poongatre (1999)
 Poovellam Kettuppar (1999)
 Nee Varuvai Ena (1999)
 Ooty (1999)
 Thirunelveli (2000)
 Mugavaree (2000)
 Kakkai Siraginilae (2000)
 Sandhitha Velai (2000)
 James Pandu (2000)
 Vallarasu (2000)
 Veeranadai (2000)
 Vetri Kodi Kattu (2000)
 Koodi Vazhnthal Kodi Nanmai (2000)
 Vanna Thamizh Pattu (2000)
 Manu Needhi (2000)
 Vetri Kodi Kattu (2000)
 Pennin Manathai Thottu (2000)
 Vaanchinathan (2001)
 Poovellam Un Vasam (2001)
 Alli Thandha Vaanam (2001)
 Thavasi (2001)
 Vaalee (2001)
 Citizen (2001)
 Azhagi (2002)
 Red (2002)
 Charlie Chaplin (2002)
 Thamizh (2002)
 Sundhara Travels (2002)
 Samasthanam (2002)
 Villain (2002)
 April Maadhathil (2002)
 Gummalam (2002)
 Jaya (2002)
 Mounam Pesiyadhe (2002)
 Julie Ganapathi (2003)
 Kadhal Sadugudu (2003)
 Arasu (2003)
 Punnagai Poove (2003)
 Parthiban Kanavu (2003)
 Thennavan (2003)
 Three Roses (2003)
 Anjaneya (2003)
 Pudhukottaiyilirundhu Saravanan (2004)
 Gambeeram (2004)
 Kuththu (2004)
 Jana (2004)
 Chellamae (2004)
 Bose (2004)
 Neranja Manasu (2004)
 Chatrapathy (2004)
 Aai (2004)
 Meesai Madhavan (2004)
 Devathaiyai Kanden (2005)
 Kannadi Pookal (2005)
 Arinthum Ariyamalum (2005)
 Englishkaran (2005)
 Kundakka Mandakka (2005)
 Adhu Oru Kana Kaalam (2005)
 Thirupaachi (2005)
 Sachein (2005)
 Ji (2005)
 Pattiyal (2006)
 Perarasu (2006)
 Varalaru (2006)
 Vattaram (2006)
 Em Magan (2006)
 Aalwar (2007)
 Muni (2007)
 Bheemaa (2008)
 Kaalai (2008)
 Pirivom Santhippom (2008)
 Vaazhthugal (2008)
 Muniyandi Vilangial Moonramandu (2008)
 Subramaniapuram (2008)
 Kuruvi (2008)
 Villu (2009)
 Innoruvan (2009)
 Sarvam (2009)
 Maasilamani (2009)
 Naadodigal (2009)
 Renigunta (2009)
 Vettaikaaran (2009)
 Singam (2010)
 Angadi Theru (2010)
 Kanchana (2011)
 Sadhurangam (2011)
 Poraali (2011)
 Mouna Guru (2011)
 Oru Nadigaiyin Vaakkumoolam (2012)
 Thadaiyara Thaakka (2012)
 Krishnaveni Panjaalai (2012)
 Murattu Kaalai (2012)
 Sundarapandian (2012)
 Settai (2013)
 Samar (2013)
 Puthagam (2013)
 Haridas (2013)
 Kutti Puli (2013)
 Ainthu Ainthu Ainthu (2013)
 Arrambam (2013)
 Thagaraaru (2013)
 Thillu Mullu (2013)
 Goli Soda (2014)
 Inga Enna Solluthu (2014)
 Pannaiyarum Padminiyum (2014)
 Vanavarayan Vallavarayan (2014)
 Poojai (2014)
 Kaadu (2014)
 Anjaan (2014)
 Lingaa (2014)
 Kaththi (2014)
 Sandamarutham (2015)
 Visaranai (2015)
 Naanum Rowdy Dhaan (2015)
 Paayum Puli (2015)
 Aambala (2015)
 Yennai Arindhaal (2015)
 Papanasam (2015)
 Romeo Juliet (2015)
 Maari (2015)
 Orange Mittai (2015)
 Paayum Puli (2015)
 49-O (2015)
 Inji Iduppazhagi (2015)
 Kathakali (2016)
 Rajinimurugan (2016)
 Tharai Thappattai (2016)
 Visaranai (2016)
 Jil Jung Juk (2016)
 Miruthan (2016)
 Sethupathi (2016)
 Pugazh (2016)
 Valeba Raja (2016)
 Narathan (2016)
 Jithan 2 (2016)
 Enakku Innoru Per Irukku (2016)
 Amma Kanakku (2016)
 Appa (2016)
 Jackson Durai (2016)
 Dhilluku Dhuddu (2016)
 Nambiyaar (2016)
 Vaaimai (2016)
 Achcham Yenbadhu Madamaiyada (2016)
 Saithan (2016)
 Enakku Vaaitha Adimaigal (2017)
 Vanamagan (2017)
 Gemini Ganeshanum Suruli Raajanum (2017)
 Vizhithiru (2017)
 Bairavaa (2017)
 Mersal (2017)
 Richie (2017)
 Aval (2017)
 Annadurai (2017)
 Sakka Podu Podu Raja (2017)
 Balloon (2017)
 Gulaebaghavali (2018)
 Mannar Vagaiyara (2018)
 Bhaskar Oru Rascal (2018)
 Diya (2018)
 Nadigaiyar Thilagam (2018)
 Raja Ranguski (2018)
 Chekka Chivantha Vaanam (2018)
 Aan Devathai (2018)
 Vada Chennai (2018)
 Thimiru Pudichavan (2018)
 K.G.F: Chapter 1 (Tamil) (2018)
 Maari 2 (2018)
 Viswasam (2019)
 Vantha Rajavathaan Varuven (2019)
 90 ML (2019)
 Thadam (2019)
 Super Deluxe (2019)
 Lisaa (2019)
 Gurkha (2019)
 Biskoth (2020)
 Eeswaran (2021)
 Parris Jeyaraj (2021)
 Kamali from Nadukkaveri (2021)

References

External links
 Official website

1987 establishments in Tamil Nadu
Film production companies based in Chennai
Film production companies of India
Film production companies of Tamil Nadu
Indian companies established in 1987
Indian film studios
Mass media companies established in 1987
Tamil cinema
Film distributors of India